Dual-covenant or two-covenant theology is a school of thought in Christian theology regarding the relevance of the Hebrew Bible, which Christians call the Old Testament.

Most Christians hold that the Old Testament has been superseded by the New Covenant, although the moral law continues to apply (cf. covenant theology); in contrast, a minority hold that the Mosaic covenant has been abrogated. Dual-covenant theology is unique in holding that the Mosaic covenant remains valid for Jews while the New Covenant only applies to non-Jews or gentiles.

Background
Judaism maintains that in the post-flood era there is a universally binding covenant between God and man in the form of the Seven Laws of Noah and that there is additionally a unique Sinaitic covenant that was made between God and the Hebrews at biblical Mount Sinai. However Judaism has not historically maintained that there is a separate covenant for gentiles wherein they should convert to Christianity. Indeed from the Maimonidean perspective, belief in the divinity of Jesus would be a breach of Noahide Law.

The 18th-century rabbinic thinker Yaakov Emden has even opined:

Later, in the 20th century, the unorthodox Jewish theologian Franz Rosenzweig, consequent to his flirtations with Christianity, advanced the idea in his work the Star of Redemption that "Christianity acknowledges the God of the Jews, not as God but as 'the Father of Jesus Christ.' Christianity itself cleaves to the 'Lord' because it knows that the Father can be reached only through him ...  We are all wholly agreed as to what Christ and his church mean to the world: no one can reach the Father save through him. No one can reach the Father! But the situation is quite different for one who does not have to reach the Father because he is already with him. And this is true of the people of Israel."

Daniel Goldhagen, former Associate Professor of Political Science at Harvard University, also suggested in his book A Moral Reckoning that the Roman Catholic Church should change its doctrine and the Biblical canon to excise statements he labels as antisemitic, to indicate that "The Jews' way to God is as legitimate as the Christian way".

Messianic Judaism

David H. Stern, a Messianic Jewish theologian, wrote that dual-covenant theology is said to originate with Maimonides. It was proffered in the 20th century by the Jewish philosopher Franz Rosenzweig, and was elaborated upon by such theologians as Reinhold Niebuhr and James Parkes.

These founders believe that Jesus' message is not for Jews but for Gentiles and, that  is to be understood thusly: "I am the way, the truth and the life; and no Gentile comes to the father except through me." Stern asserts that the problem of dual-covenant theology is that "replacing Yeshua's 'No one comes to the Father except through me' with 'No Gentile comes...' does unacceptable violence to the plain sense of the text and to the whole New Testament."

Apostolic Decree

The Apostolic Decree in the Book of Acts has been commonly interpreted as a parallel to Noahide Law.

Although the Apostolic Decree is no longer observed by many Christian denominations today, it is still observed in full by the Greek Orthodox.

Opinion of Pope John Paul II
 
Traditional supersessionist theology, as exemplified in Pope Eugene IV's papal bull, which he published at the Council of Florence in 1441:

John Paul II supported greater dialogue between Catholics and Jews, but did not explicitly support dual-covenant theology. On November 17, 1980, John Paul II delivered a speech to the Jews of Berlin in which he discussed his views of Catholic–Jewish relations. In it, John Paul II asserted that God's  covenant with the Jewish people was never revoked. During the speech, John Paul II cited Nostra Aetate, claiming that Catholics "will endeavor to understand better all that in the Old Testament preserves a proper and perpetual value…, since this value has not been obliterated by the further interpretation of the New Testament, which on the contrary gave the Older its most complete meaning, so that the New one receives from the Old light and explanation."

Criticism

A major theme of Paul's Epistle to the Romans is said to be that, so far as salvation is concerned, Jews and Gentiles are equal before God (2:7-12;  3:9-31;  4:9-12;  5:12,17-19;  9:24;  10:12-13;  11:30-32). Romans 1:16, by stating that the Gospel is the same for Jew and Gentile, may present a serious problem for dual-covenant theology.

 is sometimes cited as a verse supporting dual-covenant theology. A problem with this argument, however, is the context of Galatians 5. Galatians 5:4 in particular, says, "You have been severed from Christ, you who are seeking to be justified by law; you have fallen from grace." Line this up with Galatians 2, Galatians 2:21 in particular, which says "I do not nullify the grace of God, for if righteousness comes through the Law, then Christ died needlessly." Scholars still debate the meaning of the Pauline phrase "Works of the Law" (see New Perspective on Paul and Federal Vision).

A similar challenge is presented by Galatians 2:15 and 16, just after the Incident at Antioch, in which Paul says (speaking to Peter, a fellow Jew), "We are Jews by nature and not sinners from among the Gentiles; nevertheless knowing that a man is not justified by the works of the Law but through faith in Christ Jesus, even we have believed in Christ Jesus, so that we may be justified by faith in Christ and not by the works of the Law; since by the works of the Law no flesh will be justified."

The same exclusive claims for the Christian message are also made by other writers.  John 14:6 states, "Jesus said to him, 'I am the way, and the truth, and the life; no one comes to the Father but through Me.'"  Peter, speaking to fellow Jews about Jesus in Acts 4:12, says:  "And there is salvation in no one else; for there is no other name under heaven that has been given among men, by which we must be saved."

The First Epistle of John states, "Who is the liar? It is the man who denies that Jesus is the Christ. Such a man is the antichrist—he denies the Father and the Son. No one who denies the Son has the Father; whoever acknowledges the Son has the Father also." This does not differentiate between Jews or Gentiles, giving an argument of evidence of absence.

Catholic
Cardinal Avery Dulles was critical of dual-covenant theology, especially as understood in the USCCB's document Reflections on Covenant and Mission.  In the article All in the Family:  Christians, Jews and God, evidence has also been compiled from Scripture, the Church Fathers and official Church documents that the Catholic Church does not support dual covenant theology.

Though it is to be removed from the next edition (at order of the Vatican, as misrepresenting the editio typica) the United States Catholic Catechism for Adults (2006) states:

In June 2008 the bishops decided by a vote of 231-14 to remove this from the next printing of the Catechism, because it could be construed to mean that Jews have their own path to salvation and do not need Christ or the Church. In August 2009, the Vatican approved the change, and the revised text states (in conformity with the editio typica):

Protestant
In 2006, Evangelical Protestant Jerry Falwell denied a report in The Jerusalem Post that he supported dual-covenant theology:

See also
 Christian views on the Old Covenant
 Christian Zionism
 Christian–Jewish reconciliation
 Circumcision controversy in early Christianity
 Extra Ecclesiam nulla salus
 Gamaliel
 John Hagee
 Hebrew Catholics
 Hebrew Roots
 Jewish Christian
 Noahidism
 Solus Christus
 Supersessionism

References

External links
All in the Family:  Christians, Jews and God 
Jerusalem Post: Mar 2, 2006: Hagee, Falwell deny endorsing 'dual covenant'
Journal of Lutheran Ethics: Jewish-Christian Difficulties in Challenging Christian Zionism by Robert O. Smith: "...sometimes referred to as "dual covenant" theology. Any other understanding of the relationship, Christian Zionists argue, is a variation of supersessionism."
Ignatius Insight interview of Roy H. Schoeman: "This "dual covenant" theology seems to have been adopted to avoid the intrinsic, basic conflict at the heart of the Jewish-Catholic dialog. That is that either the Catholic Church is itself the continuation of Judaism after the coming of the Jewish Messiah – i.e., the Church is post-Messianic Judaism – or it is nothing at all."
 What is dual-covenant theology: An article by 'Catholics for Israel' opposing dual-covenant theology and comparing it to supersessionism and to the Catholic position.
THE PONTIFICAL BIBLICAL COMMISSION: THE JEWISH PEOPLE AND THEIR SACRED SCRIPTURES IN THE CHRISTIAN BIBLE
Jewish Tribune: 23 September 2009: A precarious moment in Catholic-Jewish relations

Mosaic law in Christian theology
Christian soteriology
Early Christianity and Judaism
Christian terminology
Supersessionism